Silvia's Gift is a 2003 Spanish-Chilean-Portuguese film directed by Dionisio Pérez. It stars Bárbara Goenaga, Luis Tosar, Víctor Clavijo and Adriana Domínguez alongside Ginés García Millán.

Plot 
Silvia, a teenager, has made the decision to end her life and donate her organs - heart, corneas, and liver - to three anonymous people. Prior to carrying out her decision, she records a video diary, confessing her most intimate thoughts of the past year. Carlos, a middle-aged father with an uncertain career, receives her heart. Inés, a girl born blind, receives her corneas, and Mateo, a young man living on the edge of the law, receives her liver. For all of them, this marks the beginning of a new life. However, the reason behind Silvia's decision remains unclear. The video diary is intertwined with the daily lives of the three recipients, gradually revealing the answers.

Cast

Production 
A joint effort by production companies from Spain, Chile and Portugal, the film was produced by Lorelei Producciones, Imval, El Medano, Calatambo Producciones and Cinemate in association with TVG. Filming began in A Coruña in June 2002.

Release 
The film screened at the 6th Málaga Film Festival's main competition in May 2003. Distributed by Lolafilms, the film was theatrically released in Spain on 18 July 2003.

Reception 
Jonathan Holland of Variety deemed the film (an "elegant meditation on sacrifice") to be "impressively scripted, well-played and thought-provoking".

Accolades 

|-
| align = "center" | 2004 || 18th Goya Awards || Best New Actor || Víctor Clavijo ||  || align = "center" | 
|}

See also 
 List of Spanish films of 2003
 List of Portuguese films of 2003

References 

2003 drama films
2000s Spanish-language films
Spanish drama films
Chilean drama films
Films shot in Galicia (Spain)
Portuguese drama films
Films about suicide
Films about organ transplantation
2000s Spanish films